The Nagaland Legislative Assembly election was held in Nagaland on 27 February 2023 to elect all 60 members of the Nagaland Legislative Assembly. The votes were counted and the results were declared on 2 March 2023.

Background 
The tenure of 13th Nagaland Assembly is scheduled to end on 12 March 2023. The previous assembly elections were held in February 2018. After the election, coalition of Nationalist Democratic Progressive Party and Bharatiya Janata Party formed the state government, with Neiphiu Rio becoming Chief Minister. BJP severed ties with its local ally, Naga People's Front to form the government despite NPF emerging as the single largest party.

Defections 
On April 2022, 21 NPF MLAs joined NDPP along with then leader of the opposition reducing NPF strength to 4. 

On November 2022, three BJP District President of Kohima, Wokha and Peren joined JD(U) as a major jolt to BJP

Schedule

The election schedule was announced by the Election Commission of India on 18 January 2023.

Parties and alliances

BJP and NDPP announced their alliance for the election in July 2022 and the seat sharing formula was declared on 2 February 2023. Both BJP and NDPP announced their candidates on the same day.





Others 
In a press release issued on 22 January 2023, Janata Dal (United) declared that it will not participate in any pre-poll, seat-sharing alliance with any political party. However, it would be open to post-poll alliance with like-minded parties. JD(U) was one of the first political parties to announce their candidates for the elections on 29 January 2022.

LJP(RV) decided to contest election not with any other party however party has decided not contest against BJP candidates.

Candidates

Issues 
Eastern Nagaland People's Organisation (ENPO) demanded separate state or union territory for Frontier Nagaland (or Eastern Nagaland or formerly called as Tuensang Division). The ENPO called for a boycott of the state assembly election.
Janata Dal (United) has raised the issue of unemployment, stating that 90,000 educated youths in Nagaland are still unemployed.
The separatist movement in Nagaland which has started since India got its independence.
The demand for the removal of the Centre-enforced Armed Forces (Special Powers) Act of 1958 by many Naga Organizations.
Various organisations have demanded for the imposition of the Inner Line Permit (ILP) system in the state to regulate entry of outsiders into the state, and for employment throughout the state and inter-state.

Campaigns

Clean Election 
The Nagaland Baptist Church Council (NBCC) continues its Clean Election Movement (CEM) with this state elections. NBCC first conceived the campaign in 1973 in time for the 1974 Nagaland Legislative Assembly election. Its aim was to prevent people from selling their votes or accepting bribe. Ever since, the campaign has gained momentum into a church-facilitated movement. However, NBCC leaders acknowledge that there has not been 'elaborate visible progress, but it is gaining ground slowly.' For the 2023 state elections, NBCC launched the campaign through its 20 affiliated and 4 associate church associations mid-2021. This year, CEM is part of the church's celebrations of 150 years of Christianity in Nagaland.

In October 2022, CEM issued a statement registering their protest over the declaration of a consensus candidate from Chungtia village in Mokokchung district accompanied with punitive and dismissive repercussions. They were clear that a consensus candidate through the diktat of the village council is an electoral malpractice and against the Election Code of Conduct. CEM also condemned possible declarations by other village councils or groups and called the church to be more vigilant against these practices. However, the condemnation came in rather late as the consensus candidate (B Toshikaba Longchar) was declared by the Chungtia Senso Mungdang (Chungtia Citizens Forum) on 28 December 2021 followed by the notification from the Chungtia Village Council (CVC) warning the villagers of a penalty of seven pigs for not following the diktat. A Writ petition filed at the Kohima Bench of the Gauhati High Court challenging the village resolution was first listed for hearing on 27 October 2022. T. Chalukumba Ao, a resident of the village, had approached the court challenging the resolution and consequential notice. Similarly, the Bench has admitted the case against the consensus candidate flouted by the Mongsenyimti Riongsanger Putu Menden (Mongsenyimti Riongsanger Village Council) and their resolutions in December 2021, June 2022, and October 2022. Consequent to the case regarding the village's consensus candidate, the Chungtia Senso Mungdang withdrew its resolution and the Chungtia Village Council withdrew its penalty of seven pigs on detractors.

Surveys & polls

Exit polls
Election Commission of India had banned exit polls for the period between 7am on 16 February and 7pm on 27 February, 2023. Accordingly, the exit polls were published in the evening of 27 February 2023.

Results

Results by alliance and party

Results by district

Results by constituency 

Incumbent MLA's are highlighted with background color.

See also 
2023 elections in India
Elections in Nagaland

References 

State Assembly elections in Nagaland
N
2023 State Assembly elections in India